The 1924 Drexel Dragons football team represented Drexel Institute—now known as Drexel University—in the 1924 college football season. Led by Harry J. O'Brien in his third season as head coach, the team compiled a record of 2–7.

Schedule

Roster

References

Drexel
Drexel Dragons football seasons
Drexel Dragons football